Safair is an airline based at the O.R. Tambo International Airport in Kempton Park, South Africa. It operates one of the world's largest fleets of civil Lockheed L-100 Hercules cargo aircraft.

History 
Safair Operations as it is known today was established in 1965. At the time it was known as Tropair (Pty) Ltd and was a general aviation charter company. In 1970 the company name changed to Safair Freighters (Pty) Ltd when the company was purchased by Safmarine and the new entity began operations on 18 March 1970. Its primary client in the 1980s was the South African Defence Force.

Safair is wholly owned by ASL Aviation Group Ltd based in Dublin, Ireland, a subsidiary of the Belgian group Compagnie Maritime Belge. Humanitarian Aid and Relief operations has always been Safair's "niche" market. Safair assists aid and relief agencies such as the United Nations, World Food Programme, and the International Committee of the Red Cross in delivering much needed humanitarian aid to stricken regions on the African continent as well as other areas in the world where such assistance is required. 

Until 2018 Safair was contracted to the Italian Antarctic Program (National Antarctic Research Program (PNRA)) to support science over the austral summer, flying Lockheed L-100-30 missions from Christchurch, New Zealand to Zucchelli Station in Terra Nova Bay, Antarctica. In 2007, Safair obtained its IATA Operational Safety Audit (IOSA) approval.

Fleet

 the Safair fleet consists of the following aircraft:

Previously operated
 ATR 72
 Beechcraft 1900D
 Boeing 707-320
 Boeing 727-100
 Boeing 727-200
 Boeing 737-200
 British Aerospace 146-100QT
  British Aerospace 146-200QC
 CASA CN-235
 Convair 580
 Lockheed L-100-20 Hercules
 McDonnell Douglas MD-81
 McDonnell Douglas MD-82
 Partenavia P.68B
 Partenavia AP.68TP-600 Viator

FlySafair 

In 2013, Safair created a low-cost carrier subsidiary called FlySafair. The initial plan to operate flights in October 2013 had to be cancelled, as a result of a High Court application by Comair. FlySafair is currently operational with the first flight having taken place on 16 October 2014. FlySafair operates passenger flights between Cape Town, George, Gqeberha, Johannesburg, Lanseria, Durban and East London.

References

External links

Official website

Airlines of South Africa
Airlines established in 1965
Charter airlines
Cargo airlines of South Africa
Companies based in Ekurhuleni
Kempton Park, Gauteng
1965 establishments in South Africa